Mario Loch is a German Olympic boxer. He represented his country in the flyweight division at the 1992 Summer Olympics. He won his first bout against Vichairachanon Khadpo, and then lost his second bout to David Serradas.

References

1969 births
Living people
German male boxers
Olympic boxers of Germany
Boxers at the 1992 Summer Olympics
Flyweight boxers